Evan Louis Katz (born January 7, 1981) is an American film director, producer, and screenwriter. He is best known for his directorial debut Cheap Thrills (2013). In 2014, he directed the first segment in the horror anthology film ABCs of Death 2. He is the brother of producer Peter Katz.

Filmography

References

External links 

Film producers from New York (state)
American male screenwriters
1981 births
Film directors from New York City
Living people
Screenwriters from New York (state)